The Women's 50 metre freestyle competition of the 2018 FINA World Swimming Championships (25 m) was held on 15 and 16 December 2018 at the Hangzhou Olympic Sports Center.

Records
Prior to the competition, the existing world and championship records were as follows.

Results

Heats
The heats were started on 15 December at 11:09.

Semifinals
The semifinals were held on 15 December at 19:47.

Semifinal 1

Semifinal 2

Final
The Final was held on 16 December at 19:33.

References

Women's 50 metre freestyle